1º de Maio de Quelimane is a football club based in Quelimane, Mozambique. , 1º de Maio compete in the Moçambola, the premiere football league of Mozambique.

The club (colloquially known as Operários) narrowly avoided relegation from the Moçambola during the 2016 season.

References

Football clubs in Mozambique